The Last Tightrope Dancer in Armenia is a documentary that tells the story of Zhora, 78 years old, and Knyaz, 77 years old, who were once the most celebrated tightrope dancers in Armenia.

Festival screenings and awards
The film was completed in the beginning of November 2009 and started its festival life.
IDFA 2009, November 18–28, 2009, Amsterdam, the Netherlands – Worldwide premiere
Goteborg International Film Festival 2010, January 29-February 8, 2010, Göteborg, Sweden – Nordic  premiere
8th Gdansk DocFilm Festival, (April 27–29, 2010, Gdansk, Poland)  - Special Jury Award
7th Yerevan Golden Apricot International Film Festival, July 11–18, 2010, Yerevan, Armenia – Best Armenian Film
9th Euganea Film Festival, July 9–25, 2010, Padua, Italy - Competition Program
Saratov sufferings International Documentary Film Festival, September 11–17, 2010, Saratov, Russia – The Best Cinematography
"Russia" Documentary Film Festival, October 1–5, 2010, Yekaterinburg, Russia – 
Best Feature Length Documentary
XIX International Festival of Ethnological Film, October 14–18, 2010, Belgrade, Serbia, Grand Prix
FilmFest Hamburg, September 30-October 9, 2010, Hamburg, Germany – Official selection
DOK Leipzig 53rd International Film Festival October 18–23, Leipzig, Germany – Official selection
5th Pomegranate Film Festival, October 22–24, Toronto, Canada – The Best Documentary
Listapad International Film Festival, November 5–12, Minsk, Belarus – The Best Documentary

References

External links

http://www.barsmedia.am/tightrope/index.html - "The Last Tightrope Dancer in Armenia" Official website
http://www.barsmedia.am/ - Bars Media Documentary Film Studio Official website
 "The Last Tightrope Dancer in Armenia" on PBS.

2009 films
Armenian-language films
Armenian documentary films
Tightrope walking
Films shot in Armenia
2009 documentary films
Documentary films about circus performers